This is a list of Latvian football transfers in the summer transfer window 2022 by club. Only clubs of the 2022 Latvian Higher League are included.

Latvian Higher League

RFS

In:

Out:

Valmiera FC

In:

Out:

Liepāja

In:

Out:

Riga

In:

Out:

Spartaks Jūrmala

In:

Out:

BFC Daugavpils

In:

Out:

Metta

In:

Out:

FK Auda

In:

Out:

FK Tukums 2000

In:

Out:

SK Super Nova

In:

Out:

References

Latvia
2022
Transfers